Hans Herbert Toch (April 17, 1930 – June 18, 2021) was a Vienna, Austrian-born social psychologist and criminologist. He was Distinguished Professor Emeritus in the School of Criminal Justice at the University at Albany, SUNY. He was a fellow of the American Psychological Association and the American Society of Criminology, and served as president of the American Association for Forensic Psychology in 1996. He was the co-recipient of the 2001 August Vollmer Award from the American Society of Criminology, and received the 2005 "Prix DeGreff" Award from the International Society of Criminology.

References

1930 births
2021 deaths
American criminologists
Austrian emigrants to the United States
University at Albany, SUNY faculty
American social psychologists
Fellows of the American Psychological Association
Brooklyn College alumni
Princeton University alumni